Somerset County (Pennsylvania German: Somerset Kaundi) is  a county in the Commonwealth of Pennsylvania. As of the 2020 census, the population was 74,129. Its county seat is Somerset. The county was created from part of Bedford County on April 17, 1795, and named after the county of Somerset in England.

Somerset County comprises the Somerset, PA micropolitan statistical area, which is included in the Johnstown–Somerset, PA combined statistical area.

The county is famous for being the crash site of United Airlines Flight 93, one of the four flights involved in the September 11 attacks, which crashed near the village of Shanksville after the flight's passengers struggled with Al-Qaeda hijackers for control of the plane, which terrorists intended to fly into either the U.S. Capitol or the White House.

The Somerset County Amish community is the second oldest Amish community in the world that still exists, established in 1772. It is located in the South of the county around Meyersdale and Springs.

History

Founding

Southwestern Pennsylvania began as a huge area called Cumberland County. As population increased, the area was split into smaller counties. Bedford County was formed from part from Cumberland in 1771 and is referred to as "Old Bedford County" and contained what are now 20 smaller counties. In 1773 part of Bedford County was split off to form Westmoreland County. In 1787 Bedford County was split in half with the northern part becoming Huntingdon County and the southern part remained as a smaller Bedford County. Somerset County was split off from the western part of Bedford County on 17 April 1795, and the new county's name was taken from Somerset, England. In 1804 the northern half of Somerset County was split off to form Cambria County. No further splits from Somerset County have occurred since 1804.

Colonial era
George Washington passed through the area of Somerset County on a scouting expedition in late 1753, just before the outbreak of the French and Indian War. The Forbes Road was cut through Somerset County several years later. This 200-mile stretch from Carlisle to what is now Pittsburgh was created by Brigadier General John Forbes in the British Expedition of 1758 to capture the French Fort Duquesne. Forbes Road was one of two great western land routes cut through the wilderness to create supply lines from the east. It was later the primary route of pioneers travelling to the Ohio Country.

Fur trappers and hunters were first to stay in the region. The earliest permanent white settlement in what is now Somerset County is a region known as Turkeyfoot. People of "The Jersey Settlement" emigrated from Essex and Morris Counties, New Jersey, about 1770.

United Airlines Flight 93

Somerset County gained worldwide attention in 2001 when a hijacked airliner, United Airlines Flight 93, crashed in Stonycreek Township, near the town of Shanksville as part of the September 11 attacks. The first confirmed report of the plane's crash came from Somerset County Airport as reported on NBC's The Today Show. The most likely target of this flight was the U.S. Capitol in Washington, D.C. Flight 93's cockpit voice recorder revealed crew and passengers tried to seize control of the plane from the hijackers after learning through phone calls that Flights 11, 77, and 175 had been crashed into buildings that morning. Once it became evident that the passengers might gain control, the hijackers rolled the plane and intentionally crashed it. Their actions is honored and the crash site, which is the final resting place of the passengers and crew, is now protected as part of the Flight 93 National Memorial, under the care of the National Park System. See also USS Somerset, a U.S. Navy warship which was named in commemoration of the Flight 93 tragedy.

In July 2002, Somerset County again made worldwide news when nine coal miners were rescued from several hundred feet underground at the Quecreek mine after an intense multi-day struggle.

Geography
Somerset County is one of the far southern counties of Pennsylvania, along its straight
southern edge. The county borders Garrett and Allegany Counties in Maryland, and the Pennsylvania counties of Fayette, Westmoreland, Cambria, and Bedford.

Climate
Somerset County along with Garrett County is one of the snowiest inhabited locations in the United States, with the highest elevations of the county averaging 150+ inches of snow each winter.  The county's elevation and general proximity to both the Great Lakes and the Atlantic Ocean causes snow from both Nor'easters and lake effect upslope snow events to fall from late October through early April. Snow has been recorded in Somerset County in every month except July, although local lore has it that even July saw snow in 1816, "the year without a summer." Mount Davis, the highest natural point in the state of Pennsylvania at 3,213 feet (979 m), is located in the southern part of the county.

The county has a warm-summer humid continental climate (Dfb) and average monthly temperatures in Somerset borough range from 24.5 °F in January to 67.1 °F in July.

Major highways

Adjacent counties
Cambria County (north)
Bedford County (east)
Allegany County, Maryland (southeast)
Garrett County, Maryland (southwest)
Fayette County (west)
Westmoreland County (northwest)

National protected area
Flight 93 National Memorial

State protected areas
Kooser State Park
Laurel Hill State Park
Laurel Mountain State Park
Laurel Ridge State Park

Geology
Somerset County is situated along the eastern border of the Allegheny Plateau physiographic province, which is characterized by gently folded to flat-lying sedimentary rocks of middle to late Paleozoic age. The eastern border of the county is approximately at the Allegheny Front, a geological boundary between the Allegheny Plateau and the Ridge and Valley Province (characterized by folded and faulted sedimentary rocks of early to middle Paleozoic age).

The stratigraphic record of sedimentary rocks within the county spans from the Devonian Scherr Formation to the Pennsylvanian Monongahela Formation. Most of these rocks are clastics (conglomerate, sandstone, shale), and there is little or no limestone exposed at the surface. No igneous or metamorphic rocks of any kind exist within the county.

Structurally, Somerset County has many gentle folds, the axes of which trend roughly north-northeast. Synclines include the Youghiogheny Syncline, New Lexington/Johnstown Syncline, Somerset Syncline, Berlin Syncline, and Wellersburg Syncline (called the George's Creek Syncline in Maryland). The southern end of Wilmore Syncline is at the town of Windber. Anticlines include the Laurel Hill Anticline, Centerville Dome, Boswell Dome, Negro Mountain Anticline, and an unnamed anticline between the Berlin and Wellersburg Synclines.

The primary mountains within the county are (from west to east) Laurel Hill (which forms part of the western border), Negro Mountain, Meadow Mountain, Savage Mountain, and Allegheny Mountain. Negro Mountain also includes Mount Davis, the highest peak in Pennsylvania. Each mountain trends northeast.

All of Somerset County lies far to the south of the glacial boundary, and thus it was never glaciated. However, during the Pleistocene epoch (the Ice Age), periglacial processes dominated. Most of the county was most likely a tundra during the Pleistocene. Patterned ground typical of tundra is still visible at Mount Davis, although it is somewhat obscured by vegetation.

The main drainages in southwestern Somerset county are the Casselman River and Laurel Hill Creek which flow into the Youghiogheny River along the southwest border. In the northwest, Stonycreek River, Shade Creek, and Quemahoning Creek (which flows into the Quemahoning Reservoir) are tributaries of the Conemaugh River. All these drainages are part of the Mississippi River Watershed. In the southeast, Wills Creek flows east into Bedford County and then into Maryland where it joins the Potomac River. Also, the headwaters of the Raystown Branch of the Juniata River are to the east of the town of Somerset. Both the Potomac and Juniata rivers are part of the Chesapeake Bay Watershed.

Coal fields exist within Somerset County. The coal is entirely bituminous, and much of it has been mined or is being mined by Strip mining. Most of the coal is within the Main Bituminous Field, which stretched north and west to adjacent counties and southward into Maryland and West Virginia. The rest is within the Georges Creek Field.

There are many abandoned mines in the county, and acid mine drainage is an environmental problem in many areas. Fishless streams exist as a result of the discharge from the abandoned mines. These include parts of the Casselman River, Shade Creek, Stonycreek River, and Quemahoning Creek, as well as many of their tributaries.

There are many small, deep natural gas fields in the northwestern part of the county.

Demographics

As of the census of 2000, there were 80,023 people, 31,222 households, and 22,042 families residing in the county. The population density was 74 people per square mile (29/km2). There were 37,163 housing units at an average density of 35 per square mile (13/km2). The racial makeup of the county was 97.39% White, 1.59% Black or African American, 0.08% Native American, 0.21% Asian, 0.01% Pacific Islander, 0.31% from other races, and 0.40% from two or more races. 0.66% of the population were Hispanic or Latino of any race. 41.5% were of German, 10.4% American, 7.4% Italian, 6.4% Irish, 6.4% Polish and 5.8% English ancestry.

There were 31,222 households, out of which 29.40% had children under the age of 18 living with them, 58.30% were married couples living together, 8.50% had a female householder with no husband present, and 29.40% were non-families. 26.10% of all households were made up of individuals, and 13.60% had someone living alone who was 65 years of age or older. The average household size was 2.45 and the average family size was 2.95.

In the county, the population was spread out, with 22.30% under the age of 18, 7.60% from 18 to 24, 27.80% from 25 to 44, 24.30% from 45 to 64, and 18.00% who were 65 years of age or older. The median age was 40 years. For every 100 females there were 99.80 males. For every 100 females age 18 and over, there were 98.90 males.

2020 Census

Micropolitan statistical area

The U.S. Office of Management and Budget has designated Somerset County as the Somerset, PA Micropolitan Statistical Area (µSA). As of the 2010 U.S. Census the micropolitan area ranked 7th most populous in the State of Pennsylvania and the 77th most populous in the United States with a population of 77,742. Somerset County is also a part of the Johnstown-Somerset, PA Combined Statistical Area (CSA), which combines the population of both Somerset County and the Cambria County areas. The combined statistical area ranked 10th in the State of Pennsylvania and 130th most populous in the United States with a population of 221,421.

Government and politics

|}

As of November 1, 2021, there are 48,531 registered voters in Somerset County.

 Republican: 30,651 (63.16%)
 Democratic: 13,013 (26.81%)
 Independent: 3,433 (7.07%)
 Third Party: 1,434 (2.95%)

County Commissioners

Other county offices

State Representatives
Matthew D. Dowling, Republican, 51st district
Mike Reese, Republican, 59th district
Carl Walker Metzgar, Republican, 69th district
James Rigby, Republican, 71st district

State Senator
Pat Stefano, Republican, 32nd district

United States Representative
John Joyce, Republican, 13th district

United States Senate
John Fetterman, Democrat
Bob Casey, Democrat

Pennsylvania State Police
Station Commander, Sergeant Stephen Adamczyk

Education

Public school districts

 Berlin Brothersvalley School District
 Conemaugh Township Area School District
 Meyersdale Area School District
 North Star School District
 Rockwood Area School District
 Salisbury-Elk Lick School District
 Shade-Central City School District
 Shanksville-Stonycreek School District
 Somerset Area School District
 Turkeyfoot Valley Area School District
 Windber Area School District (also in Cambria County)

Culture
The Mountain Playhouse in Jennerstown, Pennsylvania, was one of the nation's first "summer-stock" theaters. The Mountain Playhouse has maintained a full schedule of live theater productions nightly from May through October each year for the last sixty years.

Laurel Arts is one of the few, full-service arts centers in rural Pennsylvania. Centered in Somerset borough, it serves all of Somerset County through two locations: one at the Philip Dressler Center for the Arts, and the second, an Education and Dance Center located in the Georgian Place. Founded in 1976, Laurel Arts is a 501(c)(3) that offers art classes, music lessons and dance classes, as well as hosting exhibits by local and regional artists throughout the year.

The Rockwood Opera House is located in Rockwood, Pennsylvania. The building is a historic landmark restored to reflect original design from 1890. Since reopening, Rockwood Opera House has hosted dinner theater since 2000. Productions vary from Tribute Artists of classic performers to community theater.

Communities

Under Pennsylvania law, there are four types of incorporated municipalities: cities, boroughs, townships, and, in at most two cases, towns. The following boroughs and townships are located in Somerset County:

Boroughs

Addison
Benson
Berlin
Boswell
Callimont
Casselman
Central City
Confluence
Garrett
Hooversville
Indian Lake
Jennerstown
Meyersdale
New Baltimore
New Centerville
Paint
Rockwood
Salisbury
Seven Springs (partly in Fayette County)
Shanksville
Somerset (county seat)
Stoystown
Ursina
Wellersburg
Windber

Townships

Addison
Allegheny
Black
Brothersvalley
Conemaugh
Elk Lick
Fairhope
Greenville
Jefferson
Jenner
Larimer
Lincoln
Lower Turkeyfoot
Middlecreek
Milford
Northampton
Ogle
Paint
Quemahoning
Shade
Somerset
Southampton
Stonycreek
Summit
Upper Turkeyfoot

Census-designated places
Census-designated places are geographical areas designated by the U.S. Census Bureau for the purposes of compiling demographic data. They are not actual jurisdictions under Pennsylvania law. Other unincorporated communities, such as villages, may be listed here as well.

Cairnbrook
Davidsville
Edie
Friedens
Jerome

Unincorporated communities
Acosta
Deal
Gray
Jenners
Markleton
Springs

Population ranking
The population ranking of the following table is based on the 2010 census of Somerset County.

† county seat

Notable people
 Jeremiah S. Black, Attorney General of the United States (1857–1860) and U.S. Secretary of State (1860–1861), under President James Buchanan;
 Transportation pioneer George Chorpenning.
 Alexander Hamilton Coffroth (1828–1906), 19th-century Democratic U.S. Representative and Abraham Lincoln's final pallbearer to die
 Larry Critchfield (1908–1965), NFL player
 Joseph Darby, former US Army sergeant who was the first soldier to take official action against suspected and later confirmed mistreatment of prisoners by other soldiers in Abu Ghraib
 Joseph F. Loy, Wisconsin state senator and lawyer
 Howard Shultz Miller, U.S. Representative from Kansas.
 Comedian and podcasting pioneer Keith Malley, co-host of the Keith and The Girl podcast
 Edwin S. Porter, silent movie director most famous for The Great Train Robbery
 Joseph C. Pringey, U.S. Representative from Oklahoma
 Rip Engle, head football coach at Brown University (1944-1949) and Penn State University (1950-1965)

See also
Cambria Somerset Authority – Water supply authority for Cambria County and Somerset County
National Register of Historic Places listings in Somerset County, Pennsylvania
Flight 93 National Memorial – unit of the National Park System that protects the crash site of Flight 93 which the final resting place of the passengers and crew.

References

Community Festivals
Pennsylvania Maple Festival, Meyersdale, March
Farmers and Threshermens Jubilee, Rockwood, September
Springs Folk Festival, Springs, October
Mountain Craft Days, Somerset, September

External links

Somerset County government

 
1795 establishments in Pennsylvania
Counties of Appalachia
Laurel Highlands
Populated places established in 1795
United Airlines Flight 93